AMA Fight Club (American Martial Arts) is a mixed martial arts training facility located in Whippany, New Jersey & Pompton Lakes, New Jersey, specialized in training Brazilian Jiu-Jitsu, Muay Thai Kickboxing, Mixed Martial Arts & Combat Cardio Kickboxing.  A number of fighters who train at AMA have found success in a number of MMA promotions, including the Ultimate Fighting Championship (UFC), and the regional Ring of Combat.

History 
AMA Fight Club was founded in 2004 by Mike Constantino. Before opening the AMA facility, Constantino worked as a bodyguard and was also a combative martial arts trainer for law enforcement agencies.

AMA is home to The Ultimate Fighter Season 12's Andy Main and other top UFC fighters.

News 
Jamie Varner former WEC Champion joins the training camp at AMA Fight Club.

The "Lioness of the Ring," Amanda Nunes also joined the AMA Fight Club in New Jersey. As of August 1, 2011, Nunes is ranked as the #3 featherweight in the unified women's mixed martial arts ranking.

On January 20, 2012, AMA Fight Club takes an overwhelming win, with three of its most talented fighters on UFC on FX fight card.

Undefeated Khabib Nurmagomedov overcomes the dreaded Octagon jitters to earn an impressive win over Kamal Shalorus. He discusses the big win, and dedicates his performance to a fallen friend.

Charlie Brenneman dominated Daniel Roberts in the first round.

Jim Miller brought out the best and worst of Melvin Guillard as a fighter.  Miller submitted Guillard with a rear-naked choke 2:04 into the first round of their main-event bout at UFC Fight Night on FX 1 in Nashville.

January 24, 2012 UFC President Dana White confirms that Jim Miller and Nate Diaz have agreed to square off at UFC on Fox 3, which is scheduled for May 5 in Miller’s backyard at the Izod Center in East Rutherford, N.J. The matchup is the first to be confirmed for the card.

This will also be Miller's 3rd appearance on Network Television since the UFC's signing with Fox.

On Friday December 7, 2012, the New Jersey Martial Arts Hall of Fame inducted Mike Constantino of AMA Fight Club as the MMA Trainer of the Year.

Jim Miller faced Joe Lauzon on December 29, 2012 at UFC 155, replacing an injured Gray Maynard. He won the fight via unanimous decision, with the performance earning him and Lauzon the 'Fight of the Night' honors.

Notable fighters

Khabib Nurmagomedov - former UFC Lightweight Champion
Adlan Amagov - UFC Middleweight fighter
Amanda Nunes - UFC Women's Bantamweight Champion
Mike Massenzio - UFC Light Heavyweight  fighter
Charlie Brenneman - UFC welterweight fighter
Ricardo Romero - UFC light heavyweight fighter
Rafaello Oliveira - UFC veteran, lightweight fighter
Jamie Varner - Former WEC Lightweight Champion
Shahbulat Shamhalaev - Bellator - Featherweight fighter

References

External links
 

Mixed martial arts training facilities
2004 establishments in New Jersey
Kickboxing training facilities
Kickboxing in the United States